The 1947–48 League of Ireland was the 27th season of senior football in the Republic of Ireland.

Shelbourne were the defending champions.

Changes from 1946–47
No new teams were elected to the League.

Teams

Season overview 
Drumcondra won their first title.

Table

Results

Top goalscorers

See also 

 1947–48 FAI Cup

Ireland
Lea
League of Ireland seasons